Gurkhas are soldiers from Nepal.

Gurkha, Gorkha or Gorkhali may also refer to:

People
 Nepali people, citizens of Nepal also known as Gurkha and Gorkhali
 Indian Gorkha, the Nepali-speaking people of India
 Burmese Gurkha, the Nepali-speaking people of Burma

Army
 Nepalese Army, also called the Gurkha Army
 Brigade of Gurkhas, British Army units composed of Nepalese Gurkha soldiers
 Royal Gurkha Rifles,  Rifle regiment of the British Army, forming part of the Brigade of Gurkhas. 
 Gorkha regiments (India), regiments of the modern Indian Army enlisted in Nepal, successors of the Gurkhas of Britain's imperial Indian Army
 Gurkha Contingent, a department of the Singapore Police Force
 Gurkha Reserve Unit, a para-military force in Brunei

Places
 Kingdom of Nepal, also called the Gorkha Kingdom
 Gorkha District, a district of Nepal
 Gorkha Municipality, formerly Prithvi Narayan Municipality
 Another name for Prithbinarayan, a Nepali city
 Gorkha Kingdom, Ancient Nepalese kingdom
 Gorkhaland, the name of the proposed state in India demanded by the Nepalis ethnic group

Companies
 Gorkha Airlines, an airline in Nepal
 Gorkha Beer, a brand of beer brewed in Nepal

Organizations
 British Gurkhas Nepal, Administrative organisation of the British Army in Nepal.
 Bharatiya Gorkha Parisangh, a national-level organization of Indian Gorkhas
 Darjeeling Gorkha Hill Council, a semi-autonomous body that looks after the administration of the District of Darjeeling
 Gorkha Janmukti Morcha, a political party in Darjeeling district and Dooars, India
 Gorkha National Liberation Front, a political party in North Bengal, India

Wars
 Gurkha War, also known as Anglo-Nepalese War, wars fought between the Gorkha Kingdom of Nepal and the East India Company
 Sino-Nepalese War, also known as Sino Gorkha war, fought between Gurkha Army and Tibetan armies
 Gurkha–Sikh War, small conflict between the forces of Maharaja Ranjit Singh (Sikh Empire) and the Gurkha Army in 1809
 Limbuwan Gorkha War, a series of battles fought between the king of Gorkha and the rulers of various principalities of Limbuwan from 1771 to 1774 AD

Other uses
 Gorkhapatra, a Nepali daily newspaper
 Terradyne Armored Vehicles Gurkha, an armored vehicle
 Force Gurkha, an SUV
 Gorkhali (newspaper)
 Gurkha (film), a 2019 Tamil film
 The Gurkha (foaled 2013), an Irish Thoroughbred racehorse

See also
 Kukri, a curved knife also known as a Nepalese Knife or Gurkha knife or Gurkha blade